The Special Tactical Unit (STU) is an urban counter terrorist unit of the Odisha Police in Odisha, India. They specialise in urban warfare scenarios including hostage situations.

History
After the 26 November 2008 Mumbai attacks, the state of Maharashtra started an urban counter terrorism force called Force One. Later, Andhra Pradesh also started a similar force called Organisation for Counter Terrorists Operations (OCTOPUS). A similar unit, called Special Tactical Unit, was unveiled by Jugal Kishore Mohapatra, the Chief Secretary of Odisha, on 8 July 2013. After the 7 July 2013 Bodh Gaya bombings, the STU was deployed for security for the first time during the 2013 Puri Ratha-Yatra on 10 July 2013.

Organisation and role
The STU is derived from the Special Operation Group (SOG) of the Odisha Police, which is an anti-Naxalite division specialising in jungle and guerilla warfare. STU personnel have been trained by the National Security Guard (NSG) at Manesar, Haryana, and specialise in urban scenarios including hostage situations. In the future, the STU will be independent of the SOG and also act as a SWAT unit. They will be also used to protect military installations like the Chandipur missile test range and monuments like the Jagannath Temple, Puri.  The unit as of July 2013 has 30 personnel and it hopes to induct 30 more personnel in the second phase.  The plan is to gradually raise the numbers to 100.

See also
 Special Operation Group (Odisha Police)
 District Voluntary Force (Odisha Police)
 Counter Insurgency Force (West Bengal Police)
 Force One (Mumbai Police)
 Greyhounds (Andhra Pradesh Police)
 Punjab Police SWAT Team
 Special Operations Group (India)

References

Specialist law enforcement agencies of India
Odisha Police
Counterterrorism in India
2013 establishments in Odisha
Government agencies established in 2013